Margaret Court and Judy Dalton defeated Karen Krantzcke and Kerry Melville 6–1, 6–3 in the final to win the women's doubles title at the 1970 Australian Open.

Seeds
All seeds receive a bye into the second round.

Draw

Finals

Top half

Bottom half

External links
 1970 Australian Open – Women's draws and results at the International Tennis Federation

Women's Doubles
Australian Open (tennis) by year – Women's doubles
1970 in women's tennis
1970 in Australian women's sport